The Ohio High School Athletic Association (OHSAA) is the governing body of athletic programs for junior and senior high schools in the state of Ohio.  It conducts state championship competitions in all the OHSAA-sanctioned sports.

Champions

See also
 List of Ohio High School Athletic Association championships
 List of high schools in Ohio
 Ohio High School Athletic Conferences
 Ohio High School Athletic Association

References

External links 
 Ohio High School Athletic Association official website

High school sports in Ohio